, is a Japanese saving method. The word "kakeibo" can be translated "household ledger" and is literally meant for household financial management. Kakeibos vary in structure, but the basic idea is the same. At the beginning of the month, the kakeibo writes down the income and necessary expenses for the beginning month and decides some kind of savings target. The user then records their own expenses on a daily basis, which are added together first at the end of the week and later at the end of the month. At the end of the month, a summary of the month's spending is written in kakeibo. In addition to expenses and income, thoughts and observations are written in kakeibo with the aim of raising awareness of one's own consumption. Kakeibo can be a finished book or self-made.

History
Kakeibo was developed by the Japanese journalist Motoko Hani who published the first  Kakeibo in a women's magazine in 1904.

Basic concepts
The whole method revolves around four main questions being:
 How much income?
 How much to save?
 How much is spent?
 How to improve?
Furthermore, the expenses can be grouped into four categories:
 Essentials (e.g. food, clothes, rent)
 Non-essentials needs (e.g. takeout meals)
 Cultural (e.g. museum, books)
 Non-anticipated (e.g. health appointment)

References

Accounting